Water buttercup is a common name for several plants and may refer to:

Ranunculus aquatilis, the white water buttercup
Ranunculus flabellaris, the yellow water buttercup